Wayne G. Chapman (born June 15, 1945) is an American former professional basketball player.

Born in Owensboro, Kentucky, Chapman graduated from Daviess County High School and played collegiately for the Western Kentucky University.

He was selected by the Philadelphia 76ers in the 16th round (156th pick overall) of the 1967 NBA draft, by the Baltimore Bullets in the 9th round (110th pick overall) of the 1968 NBA draft and by the Kentucky Colonels in the 1968 American Basketball Association draft.

He played for the Kentucky Colonels (1968–70), Denver Rockets (1970–71) and Indiana Pacers (1970–71 and 1971–72) in the American Basketball Association for 206 games.

He coached Apollo High School basketball in the late 1970s and was the head coach at Kentucky Wesleyan College from 1985 to 1990, winning two NCAA Division II National Championships.

He is the father of former NBA player Rex Chapman.

Head coaching record

References

External links

Wayne Chapman Interview

1945 births
Living people
American men's basketball coaches
American men's basketball players
Baltimore Bullets (1963–1973) draft picks
Basketball coaches from Kentucky
Basketball players from Kentucky
Denver Rockets players
Forwards (basketball)
Guards (basketball)
High school basketball coaches in Kentucky
Indiana Pacers players
Kentucky Colonels draft picks
Kentucky Colonels players
Kentucky Wesleyan Panthers men's basketball coaches
Philadelphia 76ers draft picks
Sportspeople from Owensboro, Kentucky
Western Kentucky Hilltoppers basketball players